The 2021 Notre Dame Fighting Irish women's soccer team represented the University of Notre Dame during the 2021 NCAA Division I women's soccer season. It was the 34th season of the university fielding a program. The Fighting Irish were led by 4th year head coach Nate Norman and played their games at Alumni Stadium.

The Fighting Irish finished the season 14–6–2, 7–3–0 in ACC play to finish in fourth place.  As the fourth seed in the ACC Tournament, they lost to fifth seed Clemson in the First Round.  They received an at-large bid to the NCAA Tournament where they defeated SIU Edwardsville in the First Round, and Purdue on penalties in the Second Round, before losing to Arkansas in the Round of 16 to end their season.

Previous season 

Due to the COVID-19 pandemic, the ACC played a reduced schedule in 2020 and the NCAA Tournament was postponed to 2021.  The ACC did not play a spring league schedule, but did allow teams to play non-conference games that would count toward their 2020 record in the lead up to the NCAA Tournament.

The Fighting Irish finished the fall season 4–5–0, 4–4–0 in ACC play to finish in a tie for sixth place.  They were awarded the eighth seed in the ACC Tournament based on tiebreakers.  In the tournament they lost to Florida State in the Quarterfinals.  They finished the spring season 2–2–0 and were not invited to the NCAA Tournament.

Squad

Roster

Team management

Source:

Schedule
Source 

|-
!colspan=6 style=""| Exhibition

|-
!colspan=6 style=""| Non-Conference Regular Season

|-
!colspan=6 style=""| ACC Regular Season

|-
!colspan=6 style=";"| ACC Tournament

|-
!colspan=6 style=""| NCAA Tournament

Rankings

2022 NWSL Draft

Source:

References

Notre Dame
Notre Dame
2021
Notre Dame women's soccer
Notre Dame